Md. Akabbar Hossain (12 July 1956 – 16 November 2021) was a Bangladesh Awami League politician. He was elected to parliament from the Tangail-7 seat for four consecutive terms.

Early life
Hossain was born on 12 July 1956. He has a master's degree from the University of Dhaka.

Career
Hossain was elected to Parliament for the first time from Tangail-7 on 2001 as a Bangladesh Awami League candidate. He was the Chairman of the Parliamentary Standing Committee for Ministry of Road, Transport and Bridges.

Death 
Hossain died at Combined Military Hospital, Dhaka on 16 November 2021, at the age of 65.

References

1956 births
2021 deaths
People from Tangail District
Government Titumir College alumni
University of Dhaka alumni
Awami League politicians
8th Jatiya Sangsad members
9th Jatiya Sangsad members
10th Jatiya Sangsad members
11th Jatiya Sangsad members